Jessica Marie McDonald (born February 28, 1988) is an American professional soccer player for Racing Louisville FC of the National Women's Soccer League (NWSL), the highest division of women's professional soccer in the United States, and the United States women's national soccer team. She previously played for the Australian W-League teams Melbourne Victory and Western United as well as the Western New York Flash, Chicago Red Stars, Seattle Reign FC, Portland Thorns FC, Houston Dash, and North Carolina Courage. McDonald became a World Cup champion in 2019, with the United States team that won the 2019 FIFA Women's World Cup.

Early life
Born in Phoenix, Arizona, McDonald is the daughter of Traci McDonald and Vince Myers. Her brother, Brandon McDonald, is also a professional soccer player who plays in Major League Soccer.  She attended Cactus High School in Glendale, Arizona where she played basketball all four years and ran track during her junior and senior years. In 2004 and 2006, she was a member of state championship basketball teams and was a first-team all-state and all-region selection. She was also a state champion and record holder in the 400 meters during her track and field career. She graduated Cactus High School as the school's record holder for the 100 meters, 200 meters, 400 meters, and 4 × 400 meter relay team.

McDonald was a member of the Sereno Soccer club from 2000 to 2007 and helped the team win state championships each year she played for it. She helped lead Sereno to regional championships in 2003 and 2007 and played on the Surf Cup title-winning teams in 2005 and 2006. She was the MVP of the tournament in 2006.

Phoenix College
McDonald attended Phoenix College during her freshman and sophomore year of college where she played soccer, basketball and track and was a member of the honors program. She was named a first-team junior college All-America in soccer and National Junior College Player of the Year. McDonald earned first-team all-conference and all-region honors and was the single-season record holder at Phoenix College for goals and assists. Also continuing to excel at basketball, McDonald earned first-team all-region and all-conference honors and was the country's number one rebounder in junior college and among the Top 30 in scoring.

North Carolina Tar Heels
After transferring to the University of North Carolina, Chapel Hill during her sophomore year, McDonald joined the North Carolina Tar Heels soccer team during the first half of the 2008 season and helped the squad ultimately win the national championship as a starting striker. McDonald scored 5 goals and had 10 assists for 20 points during the season. Despite playing in only 75 percent of the team's games her first year, she led the squad in assists.

Club career

Chicago Red Stars, 2010
In 2010, McDonald was the second pick (fifteenth overall) by the Chicago Red Stars in the 2010 WPS Draft. She made five appearances for the squad before suffering a knee injury that required 18 months recovery. Chicago finished the regular season in sixth place with a  record. Following the season, the team suspended league operations in December 2010 and re-established themselves in the WPSL.

Melbourne Victory FC, 2012–13

McDonald signed with the Melbourne Victory FC in Australia's W-League (now known as A-League Women) for the 2012–13 season. She started all 13 of her appearances for the squad, scoring seven goals, and helped the squad to the Grand Final match against Sydney FC.

Chicago Red Stars and Seattle Reign FC, 2013

In 2013, McDonald signed with the Chicago Red Stars as a free agent for the inaugural season of the NWSL.   During the pre-season, she scored four goals in the second half of a match against St. Edwards University. She made nine appearances for the Red Stars during the regular season, serving one assist, before being waived by the team in June 2013.

On June 28, 2013, it was announced that McDonald had signed with the Seattle Reign FC after being waived by the Red Stars. She scored her first goal during her debut appearance for the club in a match against the Boston Breakers on July 3, 2013. Two games later, during the team's first televised match on Fox Soccer, she scored a brace against the Washington Spirit leading the Reign to a 2–1 win. McDonald finished the 2013 season with six starts in seven matches played, tallying a total of 439 minutes played. Her three goals ranked third on the squad for most goals scored – tied with teammates, Christine Nairn and Kaylyn Kyle.

Portland Thorns, 2014
McDonald was traded to the Portland Thorns along with defender Rebecca Moros in late 2013 under head coach Cindy Parlow Cone, in exchange for Danielle Foxhoven.  McDonald was a starting forward for the first eleven games of the 2014 season, then mostly relegated to a substitute position as Alex Morgan returned from an injury. The team-leading scorer for the Thorns in 2014, McDonald had eleven goals, including a July 17 goal 33 seconds in against Chicago: the fastest goal in NWSL history. This would be her only season in Portland, where she played as number 14 for a total of 1310 minutes in 24 regular-season games under head coach Paul Riley.

Houston Dash, 2015

On January 16, 2015, McDonald was traded by the Thorns to the Houston Dash for the 13th pick in the 2015 NWSL College Draft and a second round selection in the 2016 NWSL College Draft. McDonald led the Dash's inaugural season in goals with seven during the 2016 season. She scored the game-winning goal during the team's 1–0 win over her former team the Portland Thorns in May. The Dash finished in fifth place during the regular season with a  record.

Western New York Flash, 2016
In January 2016, the Western New York Flash acquired McDonald in a trade that sent two international spots and one 2017 draft pick to Houston.  Named Player of the Week for week 10 and to the Second XI list, McDonald finished third in the NWSL overall in goals scored (10), assists(7) shots (61), and second overall in shots on goal (34) for the 2016 season, McDonald earned her first senior team call-up for the USWNT.

North Carolina Courage, 2017–2021
It was announced on January 9, 2017, that the Western New York Flash was officially sold to new ownership, moved to North Carolina, and rebranded as the North Carolina Courage. In May 2017, McDonald became the first NWSL player to score 33 regular-season, career goals. She scored 4 goals in 2017, helping North Carolina win the NWSL Shield.

In 2018 McDonald played in 23 regular season games, scoring 7 goals. North Carolina broke the record for most goals scored in a season with 53. In the Semi-final McDonald scored in the 5th minute, which was the fastest goal in playoff history. North Carolina won 2–0 and advanced to their second straight final. McDonald scored twice in the NWSL Championship game as the Courage defeated the Portland Thorns 3–0. She was named Most Valuable Player of the Match. This is McDonald's second NWSL Championship.

Racing Louisville, 2022– 
On December 17, 2021, shortly before the NWSL draft, Racing Louisville acquired McDonald's playing rights in a three-way trade with the Courage and Angel City FC. Racing sent Savannah McCaskill to Angel City in exchange for the sixth overall pick in the draft plus $25,000 in allocation money, and then traded the pick to the Courage for McDonald. McDonald signed a two-year contract with Racing on January 28, 2022. She scored her first goal for Racing in a 3–2 loss to the Houston Dash in the NWSL Challenge Cup.

Loan to Western United 
In October 2022, McDonald was loaned to Australian A-League Women club Western United on a three-month guest contract for the start of their inaugural season. She made her debut and scored the club's first goal in a 1–0 victory over reigning champions Melbourne Victory in the first round of the season.

International career
McDonald has represented the United States on several youth national teams including the under-16, under-17, under-20, under-23, and the senior national team squads. In 2007, Jill Ellis named her to the U-20 roster for the 2007 Pan American Games in Brazil. The team won silver after being defeated by Brazil's senior national team 5–0 during the final.

2016 – 2018 
She earned her first call up to the senior national team on November 2, 2016, and made her international debut on November 10 against Romania. She was then named to the roster for the 2017 SheBelieves Cup that took place from March 1–7, but she did not appear in any of her teams matches. She was not named to the teams following camp for friendlies against Russia in April.

Following a strong 2018 NWSL season, McDonald was called up to the team in November 2018 for the abroad friendlies vs Portugal and Scotland. She started vs Portugal in Lisbon on November 8, and scored her first international goal, which happened to be the game winner. The 1–0 win gave the senior national team their 500th recorded victory in program history. She appeared as a substitute days later on November 13 in the teams match vs Scotland in Paisley.

2019 
In January 2019, McDonald was included in the teams training camp that took place abroad in Algarve, Portugal. She then traveled with the team to France and Spain for two friendlies that took place on January 19 and 22, where she appeared in both matches as a substitute. She was then selected in the teams roster for the 2019 SheBelieves Cup that took place from February 27 – March 5. She scored her second career international goal, via a second half stoppage time header against Belgium on April 7.

2019 FIFA Women's World Cup 
In May 2019, McDonald was named to the final roster of the United States 23-player squad for the 2019 FIFA Women's World Cup. She made one appearance for the team at the tournament, as a half-time substitute in the teams 3–0 group stage win over Chile on June 16. She did not feature in the teams remaining tournament fixtures. She became a World Cup champion on July 7, 2019, following the teams 2–0 win vs Netherlands in Lyon, France.

International goals

Personal life
McDonald's husband is Courtney Stuart. She gave birth to a son, Jeremiah, in March 2012.

Honors
Western New York Flash
NWSL Champions: 2016

North Carolina Courage
NWSL Champions: 2018, 2019
NWSL Shield: 2017, 2018, 2019
United States
 FIFA Women's World Cup: 2019
 CONCACAF Women's Olympic Qualifying Tournament: 2020
 SheBelieves Cup: 2020

Personal
NWSL Best XI: 2016
NWSL Second XI: 2014
NWSL Championship Game MVP: 2018

See also

References

Further reading
 Grainey, Timothy (2012), Beyond Bend It Like Beckham: The Global Phenomenon of Women's Soccer, University of Nebraska Press, 
 Stewart, Barbara (2012), Women's Soccer: The Passionate Game, Greystone Books,

External links

 Western New York Flash player profile 
 Portland Thorns player profile
 Chicago Red Stars player profile
 North Carolina Tar Heels player profile

1988 births
Living people
American women's soccer players
North Carolina Tar Heels women's soccer players
Chicago Red Stars players
Melbourne Victory FC (A-League Women) players
Expatriate women's soccer players in Australia
American expatriate sportspeople in Australia
OL Reign players
Footballers at the 2007 Pan American Games
National Women's Soccer League players
Portland Thorns FC players
A-League Women players
Soccer players from Phoenix, Arizona
Women's association football forwards
Phoenix College alumni
Houston Dash players
Western New York Flash players
Racing Louisville FC players
Western United FC (A-League Women) players
Pan American Games silver medalists for the United States
United States women's international soccer players
United States women's under-20 international soccer players
North Carolina Courage players
Pan American Games medalists in football
African-American women's soccer players
Phoenix Bears women's soccer players
2019 FIFA Women's World Cup players
FIFA Women's World Cup-winning players
Medalists at the 2007 Pan American Games
21st-century African-American sportspeople
21st-century African-American women
20th-century African-American people
20th-century African-American women
Women's Professional Soccer players